Smith Point Airport  is a small airport in the Northern Territory, Australia.

References

Airports in the Northern Territory